SNOtone is an independent record label founded in Baltimore, Maryland, in 2015 by Jordan Randall Smith. The label's catalogue is devoted to classical and contemporary classical music.

SNOtone is a custom imprint for recordings by Symphony Number One with plans to expand to other contemporary classical projects.

Catalogue
 ST04 (2017): Approaching: Symphony Number One, Jordan Randall Smith, conductor. Martha Horst: Straussian Landscapes; Hangrui Zhang: Baltimore Prelude; Nicholas Bentz: Approaching Eternity. 

 ST03 (2016): More: Symphony Number One, Jordan Randall Smith, conductor. Natalie Draper: Timelapse Variations; Jonathan Russell: Light Cathedral; Andrew Posner: The Promised Burning.

 ST02 (2016): Emergence: Symphony Number One, Jordan Randall Smith, conductor. Andrew Boss: Concerto for Saxophone and Small Chamber Orchestra, feat. Sean Meyers - alto saxophone.

 ST01 (2015): Symphony Number One: Symphony Number One, Jordan Randall Smith, conductor. Wolfgang Amadeus Mozart: Concerto for Flute, Harp, and Orchestra, feat. Raoul Cho, Jordan Thomas; Gabriel Fauré: Pavane; Mark Fromm: Symphony No. 1, feat. Hanul Park - bassoon.

References

External links
 Official website
 SNOtone on AllMusic

Classical music record labels
American independent record labels
Record labels established in 2015
2015 establishments in the United States
2015 establishments in Maryland